Augustana  is the third studio album by the American rock band Augustana, released on April 26, 2011 on Epic Records.

The album's lead single, "Steal Your Heart", was planned for a radio release on February 14 in order to coincide with Valentine's Day, but was released early on February 8 via AOL Music.
American Songwriter's review states the album "is full of strong, if not extraordinary material, which is sure to leave an indelible impression."

Track listing
All songs written and composed by Daniel Layus; additional music compositions are in parenthesis.  The album was voted #1 for 2011 on Alternative Addiction with over 21,000 votes.
"Steal Your Heart" (John Fredericks, Chris Sachtleben, Sam Farrar) – 3:33
"Wrong Side Of Love" –	3:32
"On The Other Side" (Evan Bogart) – 4:17
"Counting Stars" (Kevin Griffin, Julian Bunetta) – 4:18
"Borrowed Time" (Jeff Trott) – 3:10
"Shot In The Dark" (Fredericks, Sachtleben, Bunetta) – 3:26
"Someone’s Baby Now" – 3:17
"Hurricane" (Fredericks) – 5:20
"Just Stay Here Tonight" – 3:20
"You Were Made For Me (It Only Means I Love You)" – 3:27
iTunes Bonus Tracks
"Hearts Wander"
"Last Mistake"

Personnel 
 Dan Layus - vocals, guitar, piano
 Jared Palomar - bass guitar, vocals
 Justin South - drums, percussion
 Chris Sachtleben - guitar, vocals
 John Fredericks - keyboards, vocals

References

2011 albums
Augustana (band) albums
Epic Records albums